The 1986 Oklahoma State Cowboys football team represented Oklahoma State University in the Big Eight Conference during the 1986 NCAA Division I-A football season. In their third season under head coach Pat Jones, the Cowboys compiled a 6–5 record (4–3 against conference opponents), finished in fourth place in the conference, and were outscored by opponents by a combined total of 191 to 181.

The team's statistical leaders included Thurman Thomas with 741 rushing yards, Mike Gundy with 1,525 passing yards, and Hart Lee Dykes with 814 receiving yards and 42 points scored.

The team played its home games at Lewis Field in Stillwater, Oklahoma.

Schedule

Personnel

Game summaries

at Nebraska

In the second ever night game at Memorial Stadium, Nebraska won for the 25th straight time over the Cowboys.

at Oklahoma

After the season

The 1987 NFL Draft was held on April 28–29, 1987. The following Cowboy was selected.

References

Oklahoma State
Oklahoma State Cowboys football seasons
Oklahoma State Cowboys football